Alyssum is a genus of over a hundred species of flowering plants in the family Brassicaceae, native to Europe, Asia, and northern Africa, with the highest species diversity in the Mediterranean region. The genus comprises annual and perennial herbaceous plants or (rarely) small shrubs, growing to 10–100 cm tall, with oblong-oval leaves. Alyssum flowers are characteristically small and grouped in terminal clusters; they are often yellow or white colored but can be pink or purple.

The genera Lobularia,  Aurinia and Odontarrhena are closely related to Alyssum and were formerly included in it. The widely cultivated species popularly known as "sweet alyssum" (Alyssum maritimum) is Lobularia maritima. The common rockery plant (Alyssum saxatile) is Aurinia saxatilis.

Alyssum foliage is used as food by the caterpillars of certain Lepidoptera, including the Gem (Orthonama obstipata). However, rabbits will not eat it.

Species

Accepted
The following is a list of accepted species. Unless noted otherwise, it follows AlyBase. An asterisk indicates provisionally accepted names.

Alyssum aizoides
Alyssum alyssoides
Alyssum andinum
Alyssum argyrophyllum
Alyssum armenum
Alyssum artwinense
Alyssum atlanticum
Alyssum aurantiacum
Alyssum austrodalmaticum
Alyssum bargalense*
Alyssum baumgartnerianum
Alyssum blancheanum
Alyssum bornmuelleri
Alyssum bosniacum
Alyssum bulbotrichum
Alyssum cacuminum
Alyssum caespitosum
Alyssum calycocarpum*
Alyssum cephalotes
Alyssum clausonis*
Alyssum collinum
Alyssum contemptum
Alyssum corningii
Alyssum cuneifolium
Alyssum dagestanicum
Alyssum damascenum
Alyssum dasycarpum
Alyssum decoloratum*
Alyssum diffusum
Alyssum djurdjurae
Alyssum doerfleri
Alyssum embergeri*
Alyssum erosulum
Alyssum fastigiatum
Alyssum flahaultianum*
Alyssum flexicaule
Alyssum foliosum
Alyssum fulvescens
Alyssum gallaecicum
Alyssum gmelinii
Alyssum granatense
Alyssum gustavssonii
Alyssum hajastanum
Alyssum handelii
Alyssum harputicum
Alyssum hezarmasjedense
Alyssum hirsutum
Alyssum idaeum
Alyssum iljinskae
Alyssum iranicum
Alyssum kaynakiae
Alyssum kotovii*
Alyssum lanceolatum
Alyssum lassiticum
Alyssum lenense
Alyssum lepidoto-stellatum
Alyssum lepidotum
Alyssum loiseleurii
Alyssum lycaonicum
Alyssum macrocalyx
Alyssum macropodum
Alyssum minutum
Alyssum misirdalianum
Alyssum moellendorfianum
Alyssum montanum
Alyssum mouradicum
Alyssum muelleri
Alyssum neglectum
Alyssum nezaketiae*
Alyssum niveum*
Alyssum numidicum*
Alyssum ochroleucum
Alyssum orophilum
Alyssum oschtenicum*
Alyssum paphlagonicum
Alyssum patulum*
Alyssum persicum
Alyssum pirinicum
Alyssum pluscanescens
Alyssum pogonocarpum
Alyssum praecox
Alyssum propinquum
Alyssum pseudomouradicum
Alyssum pulvinare
Alyssum reiseri
Alyssum repens
Alyssum rhodanense
Alyssum rossetii
Alyssum rostratum
Alyssum scutigerum
Alyssum siculum
Alyssum simplex
Alyssum simulans
Alyssum smyrnaeum
Alyssum speciosum*
Alyssum sphacioticum
Alyssum stapfii
Alyssum stenostachyum*
Alyssum stribrnyi
Alyssum strictum
Alyssum strigosum
Alyssum sulphureum
Alyssum szovitsianum
Alyssum taygeteum
Alyssum tetrastemon
Alyssum thymops
Alyssum trichocarpum
Alyssum trichostachyum
Alyssum turkestanicum
Alyssum umbellatum
Alyssum vernale
Alyssum wierzbickii
Alyssum wulfenianum
Alyssum xanthocarpum

Formerly included
The following names are listed by World Flora Online as accepted (as of the end of 2021), but in AlyBase have either been assigned to different genera (typically based on molecular phylogeny studies) or have been reduced to synonymy. A question mark indicates doubtful synonyms or species names with unresolved taxonomic status.

Alyssum akamasicum  → Odontarrhena akamasica
Alyssum algeriense  → Alyssum granatense?
Alyssum alpestre  → Odontarrhena alpestris
Alyssum anamense  → Odontarrhena singarensis?
Alyssum anatolicum  → Odontarrhena anatolica
Alyssum antiatlanticum  → Cuprella antiatlantica
Alyssum arabicum  → Lobularia arabica
Alyssum argenteum  → Odontarrhena argentea
Alyssum aureum  → Meniocus aureus
Alyssum bertolonii  → Odontarrhena bertolonii
Alyssum blepharocarpum  → Meniocus blepharocarpus
Alyssum bracteatum  → Odontarrhena bracteata
Alyssum brughieri? 
Alyssum caliacrae  → Odontarrhena tortuosa subsp. caliacrae
Alyssum callichroum  → Odontarrhena callichroa
Alyssum caricum  → Odontarrhena carica
Alyssum cassium  → Odontarrhena cassia
Alyssum chondrogynum  → Odontarrhena chondrogyna
Alyssum cilicicum  → Odontarrhena cilicica
Alyssum cochleatum  → Hormathophylla cochleata
Alyssum condensatum  → Odontarrhena condensata
Alyssum constellatum  → Odontarrhena constellata
Alyssum corsicum  → Odontarrhena corsica
Alyssum corymbosoides  → Odontarrhena corymbosoidea
Alyssum crenulatum  → Odontarrhena crenulata
Alyssum curetum  → Alyssum idaeum
Alyssum cypricum  → Odontarrhena cyprica
Alyssum davisianum  → Odontarrhena davisiana
Alyssum davisianum  → Odontarrhena davisiana
Alyssum debarense  → Odontarrhena debarensis
Alyssum degenianum  → Odontarrhena muralis
Alyssum densistellatum  → Alyssum montanum s.l.
Alyssum desertorum  → Alyssum turkestanicum
Alyssum dimorphosepalum  → Alyssum iranicum
Alyssum discolor  → Odontarrhena discolor
Alyssum dubertretii  → Odontarrhena dubertretii
Alyssum dudleyi  → Odontarrhena dudleyi
Alyssum emarginatum  → Bornmuellera emarginata
Alyssum erigens  → Alyssum vernale
Alyssum eriophyllum  → Odontarrhena eriophylla
Alyssum euboeum  → Odontarrhena euboea
Alyssum fallacinum  → Odontarrhena heldreichii
Alyssum fedtschenkoanum  → Odontarrhena fedtschenkoana
Alyssum filiforme  → Odontarrhena filiformis
Alyssum floribundum  → Odontarrhena floribunda
Alyssum fragillimum  → Odontarrhena fragillima
Alyssum gadorense  → Alyssum fastigiatum
Alyssum gehamense  → Odontarrhena gehamensis
Alyssum gevgelicense  → Odontarrhena gevgelicensis
Alyssum giosnanum  → Odontarrhena giosnana
Alyssum globosum  → Physaria globosa
Alyssum gymnopodum  → Odontarrhena tortuosa subsp. cretacea
Alyssum hakaszkii  → Odontarrhena obovata
Alyssum haussknechtii  → Odontarrhena haussknechtii
Alyssum heldreichii  → Odontarrhena heldreichii
Alyssum heterotrichum  → Meniocus heterotrichus
Alyssum homalocarpum  → Cuprella homalocarpa
Alyssum huber-morathii  → Odontarrhena huber-morathii
Alyssum huetii  → Meniocus huetii
Alyssum kavadarcense  → Odontarrhena kavadarcensis
Alyssum klimesii  → Ladakiella klimesii
Alyssum kurdicum  → Odontarrhena kurdica
Alyssum lanigerum  → Odontarrhena lanigera
Alyssum leiocarpum  → Alyssum minutum
Alyssum lesbiacum  → Odontarrhena lesbiaca
Alyssum libanoticum  → Odontarrhena libanotica
Alyssum linifolium  → Meniocus linifolius
Alyssum longistylum  → Odontarrhena tortuosa subsp. tortuosa
Alyssum luteolum  → Alyssum granatense?
Alyssum markgrafii  → Odontarrhena markgrafii
Alyssum masmenaeum  → Odontarrhena masmenaea
Alyssum mazandaranicum  → Alyssum turkestanicum
Alyssum meniocoides  → Meniocus meniocoides
Alyssum microphylliforme  → Odontarrhena tortuosa subsp. tortuosa?
Alyssum mozaffarianii  → Odontarrhena mozaffarianii
Alyssum mughlaei  → Odontarrhena mughlaei
Alyssum murale  → Odontarrhena muralis
Alyssum musilii  → Cuprella homalocarpa
Alyssum nebrodense  → Odontarrhena nebrodensis
Alyssum obovatum  → Odontarrhena obovata
Alyssum obtusifolium  → Odontarrhena obtusifolia
Alyssum odoratum? 
Alyssum orbelicum  → Odontarrhena orbelica
Alyssum orbiculare  → Odontarrhena obovata
Alyssum ovirense  → Alyssum wulfenianum subsp. ovirense
Alyssum oxycarpum  → Odontarrhena oxycarpa
Alyssum pateri  → Odontarrhena pateri
Alyssum peltarioides  → Odontarrhena peltarioidea
Alyssum penjwinense  → Odontarrhena penjwinensis
Alyssum pinifolium  → Odontarrhena pinifolia
Alyssum polycladum  → Odontarrhena polyclada
Alyssum pterocarpum  → Odontarrhena pterocarpa
Alyssum robertianum  → Odontarrhena robertiana
Alyssum samariferum  → Odontarrhena samarifera
Alyssum samium  → Odontarrhena samia
Alyssum scardicum  → Alyssum montanum s.l.
Alyssum sergievskajae  → Stevenia sergievskajae
Alyssum serpentinum  → Odontarrhena serpentina
Alyssum serpyllifolium  → Odontarrhena serpyllifolia
Alyssum sibiricum  → Odontarrhena sibirica
Alyssum singarense  → Odontarrhena singarensis
Alyssum skopjense  → Odontarrhena skopjensis
Alyssum smolikanum  → Odontarrhena smolikana
Alyssum spruneri  → Alyssum montanum s.l.
Alyssum stipitatum  → Odontarrhena stipitata
Alyssum stylare  → Meniocus stylaris
Alyssum subbaicalicum  → Odontarrhena obovata
Alyssum subspinosum  → Odontarrhena subspinosa
Alyssum syriacum  → Odontarrhena syriaca
Alyssum szarabiacum  → Odontarrhena szarabiaca
Alyssum tavolarae  → Odontarrhena tavolarae
Alyssum tenium  → Odontarrhena diffusa
Alyssum tenuifolium  → Stevenia tenuifolia
Alyssum tortuosum  → Odontarrhena tortuosa subsp. tortuosa
Alyssum trapeziforme  → Odontarrhena trapeziformis
Alyssum troodi  → Odontarrhena troodi
Alyssum turgidum  → Odontarrhena turgida
Alyssum virgatum  → Odontarrhena virgata

References

 
Brassicaceae genera